Columbia Township is one of nine townships in Fayette County, Indiana. As of the 2010 census, its population was 993 and it contained 423 housing units.

History
Columbia Township was organized in 1819.

Geography

Unincorporated towns
 Alpine
 Columbia
 Nulltown

Adjacent townships
 Connersville Township (northeast)
 Jackson Township (east)
 Laurel Township, Franklin County (south)
 Posey Township, Franklin County (southwest)
 Orange Township (west)

Major highways
 Indiana State Road 121

References
 
 United States Census Bureau cartographic boundary files

External links
 Indiana Township Association
 United Township Association of Indiana

Townships in Fayette County, Indiana
Townships in Indiana